The men's 200 metre breaststroke competition at the 2002 Pan Pacific Swimming Championships took place on August 26–27 at the Yokohama International Swimming Pool.  The last champion was Simon Cowley of Australia.

This race consisted of four lengths of the pool, all in breaststroke.

Records
Prior to this competition, the existing world and Pan Pacific records were as follows:

Results
All times are in minutes and seconds.

Heats
The first round was held on August 26.

Semifinals
The semifinals were held on August 26.

Final 
The final was held on August 27.

References

2002 Pan Pacific Swimming Championships